Castle of Vila Viçosa is a castle located in the civil parish of Nossa Senhora da Conceição e São Bartolomeu, in the municipality of Vila Viçosa, in the Portuguese Alentejo. It was the seat of House of Braganza, prior to the construction of the Ducal Palace of Vila Viçosa.

External links
 

Vila Vicosa
Vila Vicosa
Buildings and structures in Vila Viçosa
National monuments in Évora District
House of Braganza